Chryseobacterium ginsengisoli  is a Gram-negative, strictly aerobic and non-motile bacteria from the genus of Chryseobacterium which has been isolated from the rhizosphere of a ginseng plant.

References

Further reading

External links
Type strain of Chryseobacterium ginsengisoli at BacDive -  the Bacterial Diversity Metadatabase

ginsengisoli
Bacteria described in 2013